The 2007–08 Russian Superleague season was the 12th and last season of the Russian Superleague, the top level of ice hockey in Russia. It was replaced by the Kontinental Hockey League for 2008-09. 20 teams participated in the league, and Salavat Yulaev Ufa won the championship.

Standings

Playoffs

External links
Season on hockeyarchives.ru

Russian Superleague seasons
2007–08 in European ice hockey leagues
1